"The Last Enemy" is the twenty-fourth episode of the first series of Space: 1999.  The screenplay was written by Bob Kellett (with additional material contributed by Johnny Byrne); the director was Bob Kellett.  Previous titles include "The Second Sex" and "The Other Enemy".  The final shooting script is dated 25 October 1974.  Live-action filming took place Friday 8 November 1974 through Tuesday 19 November 1974.  A three-day re-mount was scheduled from Tuesday 25 February 1975 through Thursday 28 February 1975.  This re-mount concluded the filming of the first series.

Story 
The Moon is in transit of a small solar system.  John Koenig and the Main Mission staff observe a star flanked by two small planets; one red, one blue.  They are still too distant for a comprehensive survey, but long-range spectrographic analysis reveals both planets may possess Earth-type conditions.  As Helena Russell reflects on how wonderful it would be to have a choice, far ahead on Betha (the blue planet pictured on the sun's left-hand side), a glamorous observer watches the approaching Moon with equal anticipation.  Dione, a woman of considerable importance on this planet, stands in a luxurious room that appears to be more sitting-room than operations centre.

An older woman—Commissioner Theia, head of Bethan Defence—appears on a screen to announce that the Council has unanimously decided to strike first, before the travelling Moon gets any closer.  Dione smiles predatorily; they have waited a long time for this.  Twenty-four hours later, Alpha's sensors are surveying the closer of the two planets.  When Victor Bergman announces that the planet is not only habitable but inhabited, contact procedures are initiated.

On Betha, Theia informs Dione the Moon is approaching strike position.  Dione reports to her ship, the colossal battle-wagon Satazius.  As she greets her all-female crew, her second-in-command informs her they have detected radio signals from the travelling Moon.  Dione orders them ignored and the ship leaves orbit.  On Alpha, Bergman realises that the two habitable planets revolve around their sun in such a way that they are always on opposing sides—neither planet is ever visible to the other.  However, the planet survey is interrupted by the detection of an unidentified powered object.

Sensors reveal it to be an enormous space vessel heading directly for the Moon.  Koenig orders a red alert—armed Eagles rise on the launch pads; defence screens are raised; non-combatants are evacuated to underground shelters. Koenig briefs Alan Carter to lead his Eagle squadron in a coordinated attack, with all ships firing simultaneously.  Bergman is concerned by the Commander's uncharacteristic aggression.  Koenig insists that with an adversary this large, he must assume its purpose is hostile; Bergman replies that it certainly will be once they start shooting at it.

As Satazius approaches, Dione's crew systematically disables Alpha's defences.  Attack force Eagles, defence screens, communications and Computer are incapacitated.  Their interference causes a fluctuating power loss that leaves Alpha operating on emergency services.  Satazius settles down in close proximity to the helpless Moonbase.  As Koenig and company watch from the windows, the alien ship extends a huge, multi-barreled missile launcher that seems to be taking aim directly at them.

The ship releases a thunderous missile barrage—without hitting Alpha.  The guns were firing over them.  Koenig mounts the observation balcony with a set of binoculars and observes the missile strike impacting on the red planet on the right-hand side of the sun.  Bergman speculates they have drifted into the middle of a war between two opponents that never have a direct line-of-sight to exchange fire; any missiles launched from either planet surface would be drawn in by the sun's gravity.  The arrival of the Moon has given them a ready-made gun platform in space.

The red planet retaliates.  Missiles on random trajectories batter the Moon surface in search of the enemy gunship.  One finds its mark and Satazius is rocked by a tremendous explosion.  With the Bethan gunship knocked out, all the affected Moonbase systems resume normal function.  Koenig orders Carter's Eagle One to lift-off and reconnoitre the wreck; the astronaut notes the substantial hole blasted in one side as he approaches.  As he hovers over the gunship, a tiny escape craft is launched and sets course for Alpha.

After checking the pod for any dangerous emissions, Koenig orders an airlock station opened to receive the craft.  Despite the risk of provoking an attack on the base by the opposing planet, they must obtain information from the gunship's survivors.  The craft lands at the designated launch pad, where Koenig, Helena, Bergman and a Security squad assemble at the airlock to greet its occupants.  The hatch opens to reveal a single person:  Dione.

As a military officer during wartime, the Bethan woman refuses to provide any information.  That being the case, Koenig threatens her with expulsion from Alpha.  She counter-threatens that should she be harmed, her people will send a fleet of warships to overwhelm the Alphans.  When Koenig orders her taken her back to her craft, she realises she has no choice but to capitulate.  Now exuding charm and gratitude, a cooperative Dione relates the history of the conflict and an overview of her mission—to use the Moon as a base to attack her enemies on the planet Delta.

Koenig rebukes her for involving the Alphans in their conflict.  She insists this was not her intention; her surprise strike was supposed to be swift and decisive—but the Deltans seemed prepared for this strategy.  Helena's comment 'Enemies usually are', earns her a cagy look from Dione.  Soon, the meeting is interrupted by the arrival of a large gunship from Delta.  Dione offers to call her military command for sufficient reinforcements to protect Alpha.  Koenig declines, knowing that the two opposing forces will end up shooting at each other, leaving Alpha the little guy in the middle.

The Deltan gunship launches missiles at Betha, with Dione's people replying in kind.  During a lull in the exchange, Dione expresses sympathy for the Alphans' plight, suggesting that in the event Moonbase is hit, they should seek refuge on her planet.  The barrage continues, ending when a guided missile from Betha obliterates the Deltan gunship.  With both gunships knocked out, Koenig sees the current stalemate as an opportunity for Alpha.  He proposes negotiating a cease-fire between the two planets.

Unexpectedly, Dione supports this plan—without the element of surprise, she reflects, her mission has failed.  After making a play for Koenig where she flirtatiously repeats her invitation to settle on Betha, she assists in setting up a three-way communications link between Alpha and the two planets.  When negotiations commence, it becomes apparent this is a literal war of the sexes between male- and female-dominated planets.  At first, Talos, Supreme Commander of the Armed Forces of Delta, is intractable.  After Betha's Commissioner Theia makes certain concessions, an agreement is reached.

The Alphans are given the responsibility of policing the cease-fire: the Moon's unique position in space allows them to observe both planets.  Koenig crosses his fingers that the treaty lasts for at least four hours—the time it will take for the Moon to move beyond missile range and become useless to both planets.  He gathers his advisors for a serious discussion regarding Dione's offer.  Helena finds the proposition of committing the Alpha people to a life on a planet at war unthinkable. Suspicious of the alien woman, she questions Koenig's motives for trusting Dione.

Secretly pleased with the turn of events, Dione is escorted to Sandra Benes' quarters to rest.  Sandra then goes for refreshments.  At Koenig's orders, there are guards outside the locked door and the Bethan woman is left without the means to trigger the commlock panel.  When certain she is alone, Dione puts her fingers to her temples, concentrates, and dematerialises.  When she is discovered missing, a search commences—until the lift-off of the Bethan escape pod reveals Dione's whereabouts.

Dione reboards her ship, arriving on an undamaged bridge staffed by an uninjured crew.  She contacts Theia and reports everything has gone as planned.  When Koenig calls, Dione smugly informs him he has been the victim of an elaborate deception. The 'destruction' of Satazius was the detonation of an explosive charge during a near miss—her ship is fully operational and she plans to bombard Delta until out of range.  After Dione's first salvo is launched, Talos calls, demanding an explanation.  Insisting the Alphans are innocent dupes, Koenig informs him of the Bethans' treachery.

The Deltan leader wants the coordinates of the Bethan gunship.  Koenig refuses, declaring Alpha a neutral party.  Talos savagely proclaims there can be no neutrality, as the Moon's intrusion has upset the military balance between their two worlds. He delivers an ultimatum:  Alpha will be bombarded at intervals until he receives the coordinates or the ship is destroyed. Having listened in on the channel, Dione promises Koenig that if he gives in to Talos, she will turn her guns on Alpha and fire at point-blank range.

The Alpha complex endures the first Deltan salvo.  As outlying buildings are pummeled by missiles, damage and casualty reports flood in.  With an air of desperation, Koenig contacts Dione, declaring his intent to come out and meet with her on Satazius.  Startled, she asks whether he intends to abandon his command.  With the staff voicing similar suspicions, the seemingly hysterical Commander pulls a stun-gun on them, again telling Dione he is coming out. After the channel is closed, he reveals his behaviour was a ruse, then orders Technical Section to stand by for instructions.

Dione's crew soon sights a moon buggy approaching with a single occupant.  Over the radio, Koenig demands shelter on the gunship, but Dione tells him to turn back.  He will, but only on the condition she stop firing.  She declines, suggesting that the Alphans might survive if she can destroy the remaining Deltan missile bases.  Koenig cryptically comments that, if this is her final decision, she only has herself to blame.  She then realises the moon buggy is a trap.  As the vehicle rolls beneath the ship (and out of the sight-line of the guns), the driver's helmet falls off...revealing the spacesuit is empty. Safe in his office, Koenig bids Dione good-bye as the remote-controlled moon buggy comes in contact with the hull—setting off its load of nuclear charges.

The Deltans are quickly informed of the gunship's destruction.  They acknowledge, destroying the next wave of missiles on target for Alpha.  Bergman condemns the Bethan-Deltan conflict as a futile exercise in sheer waste; he hopes they can eventually learn to live together.  After the Moon has left the system, Koenig broods over the lost opportunity.  Helena disagrees; she would rather take her chances drifting through space than live under a permanent state of war.

Cast

Starring
 Martin Landau — Commander John Koenig
 Barbara Bain — Doctor Helena Russell

Also Starring
 Barry Morse — Professor Victor Bergman

Guest Artist
 Caroline Mortimer — Dione

Featuring
 Prentis Hancock — Controller Paul Morrow
 Clifton Jones — David Kano
 Zienia Merton — Sandra Benes
 Anton Phillips — Doctor Bob Mathias
 Nick Tate — Captain Alan Carter
 Maxine Audley — Commissioner Theia
 Kevin Stoney — Supreme Commander Talos
 Carolyn Courage — First Bethan Girl (Satazius Second-in-Command)

Uncredited Artists
 Suzanne Roquette — Tanya
 Linda Hooks — Second Bethan Girl
 Tara Faraday — Third Bethan Girl
 John Lee-Barber — Eagle Five Astronaut
 Alan Bennion — Male Bethan (replaced in the 1975 re-mount)

Music 

In addition to the regular Barry Gray score—drawn primarily from "Breakaway" and "Another Time, Another Place" — Georges Teperino's composition 'Cosmic Sounds No. 3' (previously heard in "Force of Life") was used as atmosphere during the Dione-on-Betha scenes; played at a slower speed, it gave the women's planet an ethereal quality.

Production Notes 
 The original idea for this 'battle of the sexes' corollary reportedly came from series star Barbara Bain.  Writer/director Bob Kellett gave the concept a science-fiction twist in his only credited writing contribution to the programme with the age-old conflict between men and women carried out with space-age warfare.  The original title, "The Second Sex", is an obvious reference to Simone de Beauvoir's 1949 book of the same name.
 The final cut ran short, prompting script editor Johnny Byrne to write several new scenes and re-work others already shot to extend the episode to the required fifty minutes.  (Viewers can tell which footage was original and which was filmed later by the variations in quality of guest artist Caroline Mortimer's hair-dressing and make-up.)  All scenes on Satazius were part of the re-mount, as was Dione's visit to Sandra's quarters.  Footage was added to nearly all the Main Mission scenes involving Dione.  The ending was greatly extended with the last-minute addition of Koenig's plan to either convince Dione to cease fire or destroy her should she refuse.  Originally, Koenig revealed Dione's coordinates and watched as a Deltan missile destroyed her.
 Guest artist Alan Bennion, better known for his appearances in Doctor Who as the Ice Warrior Commanders Slaar ("The Seeds of Death"), Izlyr ("The Curse of Peladon") and Azaxyr ("The Monster of Peladon"), was filmed as a male Bethan subordinate conferring with Dione, but his dialogue was reworked and given to Maxine Audley's character Theia for the re-mount.
 Ironically, several segments originally filmed were dropped: (1) A scene in which Bergman and Helena express their anxiety as the first gunship approaches Alpha: Bergman states that tension makes him cheerful and chatty and Helena congratulates him for suffering from 'Lyle's Syndrome'.  (2) Koenig ordering the Alphans to board the Eagles and stand by to fly to Betha in the event of a missile hit on Main Mission and subsequent shots of people boarding the ships and the ships standing by in the maintenance hangar.
 An insight into the close relationship between the male- and female-dominated societies would have been provided with the visual effects:  the gunships of both planets were originally intended to be the same model with two different paint colours.  Taking into account that many British households in the early 1970s did not have a colour television and most viewers would not be able to discern any difference, this idea was dropped and the Martin Bower "Alpha Child"/"War Games" battleship was altered to portray the Deltan gunship.

Novelisation 

The episode was adapted in the fifth Year One Space: 1999 novel Lunar Attack by John Rankine, published in 1975.  The adaptation was drawn exclusively from the final shooting script, dated 25 October 1974; none of the re-mounted material from February 1975 was included.

References

External links 
Space: 1999 - "The Last Enemy" - The Catacombs episode guide
Space: 1999 - "The Last Enemy" - Moonbase Alpha's Space: 1999 page

1976 British television episodes
Space: 1999 episodes